Jeffrey J. Buchanan (born May 23, 1971) is a Canadian former professional ice hockey defenceman. He played in the NHL with the Colorado Avalanche.

Playing career
Buchanan was born in Swift Current, Saskatchewan. Undrafted, Buchanan played with the Saskatoon Blades of the Western Hockey League. After his overage year with the Blades in 1992, Jeff signed with the Tampa Bay Lightning on July 13, 1992. Jeff was then assigned to the Lightning's affiliate the Atlanta Knights of the IHL.

Buchanan spent the next two seasons with the Knights before he was traded by the Lightning, along with Jim Cummins and Tom Tilley, to the Chicago Blackhawks for Paul Ysebaert and Rich Sutter on February 22, 1995. Buchanan never played with the Blackhawks instead playing with the Detroit Vipers and Indianapolis Ice to end the 1994–95 season.

Three years later, Buchanan was signed as a free agent by the Colorado Avalanche on August 25, 1998. He made his NHL debut in the 1998–99 season playing in 6 games for the Avalanche. After finishing the year with affiliate, the Hershey Bears of the AHL, Buchanan announced his retirement, to take up a Financial Consultant position, in August 1999.

Career statistics

Regular season and playoffs

References

External links
 

1971 births
Atlanta Knights players
Canadian ice hockey defencemen
Colorado Avalanche players
Detroit Vipers players
Hershey Bears players
Ice hockey people from Saskatchewan
Indianapolis Ice players
Kansas City Blades players
Living people
Orlando Solar Bears (IHL) players
People from Swift Current
Saskatoon Blades players
Undrafted National Hockey League players